Johannes Bøe may refer to:

 Johannes Thingnes Bø (born 1993), Norwegian biathlete
 Johannes Bøe (archaeologist) (1891–1971), Norwegian archaeologist
 Johannes A. Bøe (1882–1970), Norwegian politician
 Johannes P. Bøe (1774–1859), Norwegian politician